Coryphaenoides is a genus of rattails which is found in all oceans of the world.

The generic name means "similar to Coryphaena".

Species

There are currently 66 recognized species in this genus:
 Coryphaenoides acrolepis (T. H. Bean, 1884) (Pacific grenadier)
 Coryphaenoides affinis Günther, 1878
 Coryphaenoides alateralis N. B. Marshall & Iwamoto, 1973
 Coryphaenoides altipennis  Günther, 1877
 Coryphaenoides anguliceps (Garman, 1899) (Loose-scale grenadier)
 Coryphaenoides ariommus C. H. Gilbert & W. F. Thompson, 1916 (Humboldt grenadier)
 Coryphaenoides armatus (J. Hector, 1875) (Abyssal grenadier)
 Coryphaenoides asper Günther, 1877
 Coryphaenoides asprellus (H. M. Smith & Radcliffe, 1912)
 Coryphaenoides boops (Garman, 1899) (Short-snout grenadier)
 Coryphaenoides brevibarbis (Goode & T. H. Bean, 1896) (Short-beard grenadier)
 Coryphaenoides bucephalus (Garman, 1899) (Narrow-snout grenadier)
 Coryphaenoides bulbiceps (Garman, 1899) (Large-eye grenadier)
 Coryphaenoides camurus (H. M. Smith & Radcliffe, 1912)
 Coryphaenoides capito (Garman, 1899) (Big-head grenadier)
 Coryphaenoides carapinus Goode & T. H. Bean, 1883 (Carapine grenadier)
 Coryphaenoides carminifer (Garman, 1899) (Carmine grenadier)
 Coryphaenoides castaneus Shcherbachev & Iwamoto, 1995
 Coryphaenoides cinereus (C. H. Gilbert, 1896) (Pop-eye grenadier)
 Coryphaenoides delsolari Chirichigno F. & Iwamoto, 1977 (Trident grenadier)
 Coryphaenoides dossenus P. J. McMillan, 1999 (Humpback whiptail)
 Coryphaenoides dubius (H. M. Smith & Radcliffe, 1912)
 Coryphaenoides fernandezianus (Günther, 1887) (Fernandez whiptail)
 Coryphaenoides ferrieri (Regan, 1913)
 Coryphaenoides filamentosus Okamura, 1970
 Coryphaenoides filicauda Günther, 1878 (Grenadier)
 Coryphaenoides filifer (C. H. Gilbert, 1896) (Filamented rattail)
 Coryphaenoides grahami Iwamoto & Shcherbachev, 1991 (Graham's whiptail)
 Coryphaenoides guentheri (Vaillant, 1888) (Günther's grenadier)
 Coryphaenoides gypsochilus Iwamoto & J. E. McCosker, 2001
 Coryphaenoides hextii (Alcock, 1890)
 Coryphaenoides hoskynii (Alcock, 1890)
 Coryphaenoides lecointei (Dollo, 1900)
 Coryphaenoides leptolepis Günther, 1877 (Ghostly grenadier)
 Coryphaenoides liocephalus (Günther, 1887) (Bearded rattail)
 Coryphaenoides longicirrhus (C. H. Gilbert, 1905)
 Coryphaenoides longifilis Günther, 1877 (Long-fin grenadier)
 Coryphaenoides macrolophus (Alcock, 1889)
 Coryphaenoides marginatus Steindachner & Döderlein (de), 1887 (Amami grenadier)
 Coryphaenoides marshalli Iwamoto, 1970
 Coryphaenoides mcmillani Iwamoto & Shcherbachev, 1991 (McMillan's whiptail)
 Coryphaenoides mediterraneus (Giglioli, 1893) (Mediterranean grenadier)
 Coryphaenoides mexicanus (A. E. Parr, 1946) (Mexican grenadier)
 Coryphaenoides microps (H. M. Smith & Radcliffe, 1912)
 Coryphaenoides microstomus P. J. McMillan, 1999
 Coryphaenoides murrayi Günther, 1878 (Abyssal rattail)
 Coryphaenoides myersi Iwamoto & Sazonov, 1988 (Myers' grenadier)
 Coryphaenoides nasutus Günther, 1877 (Large-nose grenadier)
 Coryphaenoides oreinos Iwamoto & Sazonov, 1988
 Coryphaenoides orthogrammus (H. M. Smith & Radcliffe, 1912)
 Coryphaenoides paramarshalli Merrett, 1983
 Coryphaenoides profundicolus (Nybelin, 1957) (Deep-water grenadier)
 Coryphaenoides rudis Günther, 1878 (Rudis rattail) 
 Coryphaenoides rupestris Gunnerus, 1765 (Round-nose grenadier)
 Coryphaenoides semiscaber C. H. Gilbert & C. L. Hubbs, 1920
 Coryphaenoides serrulatus Günther, 1878 (Serrulate whiptail)
 Coryphaenoides sibogae M. C. W. Weber & de Beaufort, 1929
 Coryphaenoides soyoae Nakayama & Endo, 2016 (Black grenadier) 
 Coryphaenoides spinulosus (C. H. Gilbert & Burke, 1912)
 Coryphaenoides striaturus Barnard, 1925 (Striate whiptail)
 Coryphaenoides subserrulatus Makushok, 1976 (Long-rayed whiptail)
 Coryphaenoides thelestomus Maul, 1951 (Rough-lip grenadier)
 Coryphaenoides tydemani (M. C. W. Weber, 1913)
 Coryphaenoides woodmasoni (Alcock, 1890)
 Coryphaenoides yaquinae Iwamoto & Stein, 1974
 Coryphaenoides zaniophorus (Vaillant, 1888) (Thick-beard grenadier)

References

Macrouridae
Articles containing video clips
Extant Chattian first appearances
Chattian genus first appearances
Taxa named by Johan Ernst Gunnerus